William Parsons Alexander (19 January 1877 – Unknown), was an Anglo-Spanish footballer who played as a forward for FC Barcelona. He is best known for being one of the founders of FC Barcelona in 1899, and then serving as the club's vice-captain in 1899 and 1900.

Biography
Born in Barcelona of English ancestry, William Parsons, together with his brother John, was one of the first pioneers of football in Catalonia, having played a match for Sociedad de Foot-Ball de Barcelona against Asociación de Foot-Ball de Torelló on 2 February 1895, which was the very first time that teams from two different cities played against each other in Catalonia, and he rose to the occasion, scoring once in an 8–3 local win. Parsons played several friendly matches at Can Tunis and a few others at Bonanova between 1892 and 1895, where he stood out as a great goal scorer, however, due to the little statistical rigor that the newspapers had at that time, the exact amount of goals he netted is unknown.

Despite some encouraging first steps, this Society was never officially established and when its founder and captain James Reeves returned to the United Kingdom in the autumn of 1895, it was the Catalans and the Parsons brothers who took the reins of the team, but without Reeves, the entity soon declined, collapsed and seems to disappear around 1896. Football in the city then crosses its first crisis which lasted three years from 1896 until 1899, with the Parsons playing an important role in the sport's return to the city, helping with the creations of Team Anglès and FC Barcelona, both in 1899.

In 1899 he and his brother were among the twelve men who attended the infamous meeting held at the Gimnasio Solé on 29 November 1899 which saw the birth of Foot-Ball Club Barcelona. However, in Barcelona's official debut on 8 December 1899, the two Parsons brothers played for the rival team, Team Anglès, which consisted of members of the British colony living in Barcelona, such as the two of them and the Witty brothers (Arthur and Ernest), helping Anglès to a 1–0 win.

Five days later, on 13 December 1899, the Blaugrana team merges with the Team Anglès, which leads to the expansion of the board of directors with his brother John Parsons becoming the vice-president of the club while he was appointed the vice-captainancy of the team, but he did not get to play a single game with the club because, in February 1900, he left for Manila for family reasons, leaving the vice-captaincy of Barcelona in the hands of Ernest Witty.

William was also one of the founders of the Real Club de Tenis Barcelona.

References

1877 births
Year of death missing
Footballers from Barcelona
Spanish footballers
Association football midfielders
FC Barcelona players
Spanish people of English descent